Psychiatry Research: Neuroimaging is a peer-reviewed medical journal and an official publication of the International Society for Neuroimaging in Psychiatry. It is a section of the journal Psychiatry Research. The editors-in-chief are M.S. Buchsbaum, K. Maurer, T. Dierks, and A. Pfefferbaum, and it is published by Elsevier. The journal covers applications of neuroimaging in psychiatric research and clinical practice. According to the Journal Citation Reports, the journal has a 2011 impact factor of 2.964.

See also
 List of psychiatry journals

References

External links 
 
 International Society for Neuroimaging in Psychiatry

Psychiatry journals
Neuroimaging journals
Elsevier academic journals
Publications with year of establishment missing
Monthly journals
English-language journals